Jean Isabel Melzer  (7 February 1926 – 18 June 2013) was an Australian Senator representing the Australian Labor Party and the state of Victoria.

She was elected at the 1974 election, becoming the first woman Labor senator from Victoria. In 1978 she was the first woman elected as the Secretary of the Labor Caucus. She served two terms, being defeated at the 1980 election as she was placed third on the Labor ticket. Her final term ended on 30 June 1981.

She stood unsuccessfully as the lead Victorian senate candidate for the Nuclear Disarmament Party in the 1984 election. She received 7.1% of the vote.

Melzer was the president of U3A Network Victoria. She died on 18 June 2013.

References

External links
 Melzer photo

Potential sources
MS 3683 Records of the Women's Electoral Lobby (Australia) Series 7: Political lobbying records, 1972–89 folder 18–19 held at NLA
Paper presented at National Labor Women's Conference, Canberra, 29 January-1 February 1982
Paper presented at 2nd Women and Labour Conference, Melbourne, 17 May 1980 paper called "Is Parliament Relevant to Women and. Their Search for Identity?" 

1926 births
2013 deaths
Australian Labor Party members of the Parliament of Australia
Members of the Australian Senate for Victoria
Women members of the Australian Senate
Nuclear Disarmament Party politicians
20th-century Australian politicians
Recipients of the Medal of the Order of Australia
20th-century Australian women politicians
People from Elsternwick, Victoria
Politicians from Melbourne